Mysore State, colloquially Old Mysore, was a state within the Dominion of India and the subsequent Republic of India from 1947 until 1956. The state was formed by renaming the Kingdom of Mysore, and Bangalore replaced Mysore as the state's capital. When Parliament passed the States Reorganisation Act in 1956, Mysore State was considerably enlarged when it became a linguistically homogeneous Kannada-speaking state within the Republic of India by incorporating territories from Andhra, Bombay, Coorg, Hyderabad, and Madras States, as well as other petty fiefdoms. It was subsequently renamed Karnataka in 1973.

History 
The Kingdom of Mysore was one of the three largest princely states in British India. Upon India's independence from Britain in 1947, Maharaja Jayachamarajendra Wadiyar signed the instrument of accession, incorporating his realm with the Union of India, on 15 August 1947. The territories of the erstwhile princely state of Mysore were then reconstituted into a state within the Union.

Reorganisation 

In 1956, the Government of India effected a comprehensive re-organisation of provincial boundaries, based upon the principle of shared language. As a result of the States Reorganisation Act on 1 November 1956, the Kannada-speaking districts of Belgaum (exclusing Chandgad), Bijapur, Dharwad, and North Canara were transferred from Bombay to Mysore. Bellary was transferred from Andhra; South Canara was transferred from Madras; and Koppal, Raichur, Kalaburagi and Bidar districts from Hyderabad. Also, the small Coorg State was merged, becoming a district in Mysore. The state was renamed Karnataka on 1 November 1973.

Maharaja of Mysore

RajPramukh of Mysore

Governors of Mysore

Chief ministers of Mysore State

See also 
 Bombay State
 Political integration of India

Note

References 

1947 establishments in India
1973 disestablishments in India
 
Former states and territories of India
History of Karnataka (1947–present)
1960 disestablishments in India